The 1914 All-Western Conference football team consists of American football players selected to the all-conference team for the Western Conference, later known as the Big Ten Conference, as chosen by various selectors for the 1914 college football season.

All-Western Conference selections

Ends
 Boyd Cherry, Ohio State (WE-1)
 George K. Squier, Illinois (WE-1)
 Perry Graves, Illinois (WE-2)
 Sanderson, Iowa (WE-2)

Tackles
 Cub Buck, Wisconsin (WE-1)
 Laurens Shull, Chicago (WE-1)
 Ray Keeler, Wisconsin (WE-2)
 Lennox F. Armstrong, Illinois (WE-2)

Guards
 Ralph Chapman, Illinois (WE-1)
 H. B. Routh, Purdue (WE-1)
 Arlie Mucks, Wisconsin (WE-2)
 Herman Stegeman, Chicago (WE-2)

Centers
 Paul Des Jardien, Chicago (WE-1) (CFHOF)
 Boles Rosenthal, Minnesota (WE-2)

Quarterbacks
 George Clark, Illinois (WE-1)
 Pete Russell, Chicago (WE-2)

Halfbacks
 Harold Pogue, Illinois (WE-1)
 Wilbur Hightower, Northwestern (WE-1)
Gray, Chicago (WE-2)

Fullbacks 
 Lorin Solon, Minnesota (WE-1)
 Eugene Schobinger, Illinois (WE-2)

Key
WE = Walter Eckersall

See also
1914 College Football All-America Team
1914 All-Western college football team

References

1914 Western Conference football season
All-Big Ten Conference football teams